Brian Carter Tutt (born June 9, 1962 in Swalwell, Alberta) is a Canadian former ice hockey player who played briefly for the Washington Capitals of the National Hockey League, playing seven games for the team during the 1989-90 NHL season, scoring one goal. He was originally drafted in 1980 by the Philadelphia Flyers, 126th overall.

Tutt was a member of the Canadian national team which won a silver medal in the 1992 Winter Olympics.

He is the father of the speed skater Brianne Tutt who represented Canada at the 2014 Winter Olympics in Sochi, Russia, and at the 2018 Winter Olympics in PyeongChang, South Korea.

Career statistics

Regular season and playoffs

International

References

External links

1962 births
Living people
Adler Mannheim players
Baltimore Skipjacks players
Calgary Canucks players
Calgary Wranglers (WHL) players
Canadian ice hockey defencemen
Hannover Scorpions players
Hershey Bears players
Ice hockey people from Alberta
Ice hockey players at the 1992 Winter Olympics
Ilves players
Medalists at the 1992 Winter Olympics
Olympic ice hockey players of Canada
Olympic medalists in ice hockey
Olympic silver medalists for Canada
People from Kneehill County
Philadelphia Flyers draft picks
SaPKo players
Schwenninger Wild Wings players
Springfield Indians players
Washington Capitals players
Canadian expatriate ice hockey players in Finland
Canadian expatriate ice hockey players in Germany